Munyasia is a surname. Notable people with the surname include:

David Munyasia (born 1980), Kenyan boxer
Pius Munyasia (born 1960), Kenyan racewalker